Bluejuice was an Australian band based in Sydney, active between 2000 and 2014. The group's final line-up consisted of lead vocalist Jake Stone, backing vocalist Stavros Yiannoukas, bassist Jamie Cibej and drummer James Hauptmann. The band released three studio albums Problems, Head of the Hawk and Company as well as a greatest hits album in 2014.

History

2000–2006: Career beginning and EPs
In 2003, the band released their debut extended play Zebraaazz. In 2003, the band won the Musicoz Australian Independent Music Award, which aims to promote and encourage artists from the independent music community.

In 2005, a second extended play titled, The Good Luck Pig was released.

2007–2008: Problems
Bluejuice released their debut studio album Problems in 2007. Problems was well received by Rolling Stone magazine in Australia, which awarded the album a four out of five rating.

The band's first single, "Vitriol", enjoyed airplay on the Australian national radio network Triple J, being the second most popular track in 2007 and ultimately reaching No. 11 in the annual Triple J Hottest 100 countdown in 2007. "Vitriol" ranked number 67 in the Australian Rolling Stone Magazine's 100 Best songs of 2007. The video clip for "Vitriol" won best clip at Sunscreen Video Awards in 2007. The album spawned two further singles; "The Reductionist" and "Phantom Boogie".

2009–2010: Head of the Hawk
In 2009, Bluejuice signed to the Australian record label Dew Process and recorded their second studio album at Big Jesus Burger in Sydney with producer/mixer Chris Shaw (Bob Dylan, Public Enemy, Super Furry Animals, Weezer). The album's lead single "Broken Leg" debuted on the Australian Singles Chart at number 47 on 23 August 2009. They released the album Head of the Hawk on 18 September 2009, and it debuted at No. 37 on the Australian Albums Chart. "Broken Leg" eventually peaked at No. 27 on the Australian Singles Chart and was certified gold. "Broken Leg" polled at No. 5 in the Triple J Hottest 100, 2009. The band promoted the album by performing the song on Channel Seven's Sunrise and Channel Nine's Wide World of Sports.

AT the ARIA Music Awards of 2009, "Broken Leg" was nominated for Breakthrough Artist and Best Video.

The album's second single was "(Ain't) Telling the Truth", was released in February 2010 and "Head of the Hawk" followed later in the year. In September 2010, Hawthorn Football Club players Ben Stratton, Jarryd Morton, Matt Suckling and Liam Shiels re-enacted the "Broken Leg" video clip live as part of the 2010 Player Review on the AFL Footy Show.

2011–2012: Company
In October 2011, Bluejuice released "Act Yr Age" as the lead single from their third studio album. In November 2011, Bluejuice released their third studio album Company. The album spawned two further singles in 2012, "On My Own" and "The Recession".

2013–2014: Break up and Retrospectable
In March 2013, the band's keyboard player, bassist, guitarist and drummer, Jerry Craib, announced his resignation from the band. The public became aware of the decision due to an announcement on the Bluejuice Facebook fan page. The phrase "formidable musical talents" was also used to describe Craib in the Facebook post and information on Craib's future was not provided; however, the band stated that it wished for Craib to return to Bluejuice at another time.

In August 2013, Australian hip hop trio Bliss N Eso released the song "Act Your Age", which sampled Bluejuice's 2011 song "Act Yr Age". At the APRA Music Awards of 2014, the song won Urban Work of the Year.

On 3 August 2014, Stone announced the dissolution of Bluejuice during an interview on Triple J. A "eulogy" was published on the Australian music website Faster Louder later in the month. 

As part of the dissolution process, Bluejuice released a new single "I'll Go Crazy" as part of a "greatest hits" record, Retrospectable, released in September 2014. The group announced a farewell Australian tour which ran over September and October 2014, and included shows in Sydney, Melbourne and Adelaide, as well as a North Queensland leg and some regional dates. The tour saw a number of sold-out shows, including both gigs at Sydney's Metro Theatre.

2015–present: Solo careers 
On 28 November 2016, Stone released his first single under his own name, "Trick of the Light", through Australian music website Happy Mag alongside an interview. The song was produced by and co-written with longtime Bluejuice collaborator Alex Gooden, features guitar contributions from Bluejuice touring guitarist Dan Farrugia, and additional vocals and production from Dan Williams from Art vs. Science. Since that time, the former band members have pursued careers outside of performance. Of note, Stone has produced multiple music industry events, and Yiannoukas works as a voiceover artist.

2022: reformation and Jelly
In October 2022, Bluejuice announced two November 2022 releases; an EP titled Jelly, featuring previously unreleased tracks and a re-released of their 2011 studio album Company on vinyl for the first time.

Musical style
The musical style of Bluejuice has variously been described as "punk-hop", "downtempo hip hop, ska-tinged pop and pounding disco" and "too straight for funk, too groovy for indie rock and too sweaty for pop".

Discography

Studio albums

Compilation albums

Extended plays

Singles

Awards and nominations

APRA Awards
The APRA Awards are presented annually from 1982 by the Australasian Performing Right Association (APRA), "honouring composers and songwriters". They commenced in 1982.

! 
|-
| 2010 
| "Broken Leg" (Jeremy Craib, Jamie Cibej, James Hauptmann, Edmund Molesworth, Jacob Stone, Stavros Yiannoukas)
| Song of the Year
| 
| 
|-
| 2012 
| "Act Your Age" – Bliss n Eso featuring Bluejuice (Alexander Burnett, Jeremy Craib, James Cibej, Jacob Stone, Stavros Yiannoukas, James Hauptmann)
| Song of the Year
| 
| 
|-
| 2014 
| "Act Your Age" – Bliss n Eso featuring Bluejuice
| Urban Work of the Year
| 
| 
|-

ARIA Music Awards
The ARIA Music Awards are annual awards, which recognises excellence, innovation, and achievement across all genres of Australian music. Bluejuice received sixnominations.

|-
| rowspan="2"| 2009 ||rowspan="2"| "Broken Leg" || ARIA Award for Best Video || 
|-
| Breakthrough Artist || 
|-
| rowspan="2"| 2010 ||rowspan="2"| Head of the Hawk|| ARIA Award for Best Pop Release || 
|-
| ARIA Award for Best Cover Art || 
|-
|| 2012 || Sam Bennetts for Bluejuice "Act Yr Age" || ARIA Award for Best Video || 
|-
|| 2014 || Christian J Henrich & Nicholas Rabone for Bluejuice "SOS" || ARIA Award for Best Video || 
|-

Australian Music Prize
The Australian Music Prize is an annual award of $30,000 given to an Australian band or solo artist in recognition of the merit of an album released during the year of award.

|-
| rowspan="2"| 2007 || Problems || Australian Music Prize || 
|-
| Bluejuice || Outstanding Potential || 
|-

J Award
The J Awards are an annual series of Australian music awards that were established by the Australian Broadcasting Corporation's youth-focused radio station Triple J. They commenced in 2005.

|-
| J Awards of 2011
|"Act Yr Age"
| Australian Video of the Year
| 
|-
| J Awards of 2013
| "SOS"
| Australian Video of the Year
|

References

External links

Australian indie rock groups
Australian indie pop groups
Musical groups from Sydney
Dew Process artists
Musical quintets
Musical groups established in 2001
Musical groups disestablished in 2014